Losev is a common Russian surname, derived from the word (лось, en: "elk" or "moose"). It may refer to:.

A. Losev, 19th century Army General of the Russian Empire
Aleksei Losev, philosopher
Igor Losev, Russian football player (FK Rīga)
Ivan Losev (racewalker) (b. 1986), Ukrainian racewalker
Ivan Losev (mathematician) (b. 1981), Belarusian-American mathematician
Lev Vladimirovich Losev, Russian poet and essayist
Oleg Vladimirovich Losev, one of the first researchers of LED
Sergei Losev (b. 1983), Russian football player
Sergei Losev (scientist), co-author of the MacBride report
Valeri Losev, Soviet volleyball player in the 1980s
Viktor Losev, Soviet football player in the 1980s
Yevgeni Losev (b. 1979), Russian football player